Abdulinsky (masculine), Abdulinskaya (feminine), or Abdulinskoye (neuter) may refer to:    

Abdulinsky District, a district of Orenburg Oblast, Russia    
Abdulinsky Urban Okrug, a municipal formation in Orenburg Oblast, Russia

See also    
Abdulino